Galal or Gelal may refer to any of the following locations in Iran:
 Galal, Ilam
 Gelal, Kermanshah
 Galal, Khuzestan 
 Gelal River at Khorramabad